ISO 31-5 is the part of international standard ISO 31 that defines names and symbols for quantities and units related to electricity and magnetism. It is superseded by ISO 80000-6.

Some of its definitions are below, with values taken from NIST values of the constants:

00031-05